Welshpool is an inner southeastern suburb of Perth, Western Australia, located mostly within the City of Canning and partially within the Town of Victoria Park.

The area is one of the main industrial areas of Perth, along with Kewdale, Kwinana Beach, Henderson, Malaga, O'Connor, Canning Vale and Osborne Park.

It is the location of the Welshpool railway station.

Welshpool is visually known for its 3 complexes of silo towers. These house storage of feed products for the poultry and agricultural industries.

Welshpool is a traditional industrial suburb partly to the fact of its proximity to Perth Airport and short distance to the Perth CBD.

Transport 
Welshpool is home to Welshpool railway station; it is served by the Armadale and Thornlie lines. Welshpool Station is due to close in 2023 due to the Modernisation of the Armadale and Thornlie lines and low patronage. Welshpool Station is served by no bus routes, though routes 282 and 283 are located close by on Welshpool Road. Both these routes run from Elizabeth Quay bus station to Kalamunda bus station.

References

External links
 

Suburbs of Perth, Western Australia